The 1979 Tour du Haut Var was the 11th edition of the Tour du Haut Var cycle race and was held on 25 February 1979. The race started in Nice and finished in Seillans. The race was won by Joop Zoetemelk.

General classification

References

1979
1979 in road cycling
1979 in French sport